Sandra Marton (born June 30, 19?? in the United States) is a best-selling American author of over 86 romance novels in Harlequin Enterprises Ltd since 1985.
In 2012, she began writing self-published novels. Six titles are currently available: "The Prince of Pleasure,"  "Emily: Sex & Sensibility," "Jaimie: Fire & Ice," "Lissa: "Sugar & Spice," "The Gift," and "On the Wilde Side."

Biography
Sandra graduated from high school with honors in English, and graduated cum laude from college with highest departmental honors in English.

She is married and has a divorced son, a granddaughter and a grandson. She resides in southern New England, United States.

Bibliography

Single Novels
Rapture in the Sands (1985)
From This Day Forward (1985)
Game of Deceit (1986)
Out of the Shadows (1986)
Intimate Strangers (1987)
Lovescenes (1987)
Heart of the Hawk (1988)
A Flood of Sweet Fire (1988)
Deal with the Devil (1988)
Cherish the Flame (1988)
Fly Like an Eagle (1989)
Eye of the Storm (1989)
Consenting Adults (1990)
Nightfires (1990)
Garden of Eden (1990)
The Corsican Gambit (1991)
That Long-ago Summer (1991)
Roarke's Kingdom (1991)
A Bride for the Taking (1992)
No Need for Love (1993)
Hostage of the Hawk (1994)
Master of El Corazon (1994)
Emerald Fire (1995)
Til Tomorrow (1996)
The Second Mrs. Adams (1996)
Until You (1997)
Mediterranean Moments (2002)
The Borghese Bride (2003)
For Love or Money (2003)
The Sicilian's Christmas Bride (2006)

Dreams Series
By Dreams Betrayed (1990)
Lost in a Dream (1991)

Landon's Legacy Series
An Indecent Proposal (1995)
Guardian Groom (1995)
Hollywood Wedding (1996)
Spring Bride (1996)

Wedding of the Year! Series
The Bride Said Never! (1997)
The Divorcee Said Yes! (1997)
The Groom Said Maybe! (1998)
Wedding of the Year (Omnibus) (2002) (The Bride Said Never! / The Divorcee Said Yes! / The Groom Said Maybe!)

The Romano Series
The Sexiest Man Alive (1998)
Romano's Revenge (2000)

The Barons Series
Marriage on the Edge (1999)
More Than a Mistress (1999)
Slade Baron's Bride (1999)
The Taming of Tyler Kincaid (2000)
Mistress of the Sheik (2000)
The Alvares Bride (2001)
The Pregnant Mistress (2002)
Raising the Stakes (2002)

The O'Connells Series
Keir O'Connell's Mistress (2003)
The Sicilian Surrender (2003)
Claiming His Love-Child (2004)
The Sheikh's Convenient Bride (2004)
The One-Night Wife (2004)
The Sicilian Marriage (2005)

Knight Brothers Series
The Desert Virgin (2006)
Captive in His Bed (2006)
Naked in His Arms (2006)

Billionaires' Brides Series
The Italian Prince's Pregnant Bride (2007)
The Greek Prince's Chosen Wife (2007)
The Spanish Prince's Virgin Bride (2007)

The Sheikh Tycoons Series
The Sheikh's Defiant Bride (2008)
The Sheikh's Wayward Wife (2008)
The Sheikh's Rebellious Mistress (2008)

The Orsini Brothers / Orsini Brides Series
Raffaele: Taming His Tempestuous Virgin (2009)
Dante: Claiming His Secret Love-Child (2009)
Falco: The Dark Guardian  (2010)
Nicolo: The powerful Sicilian  (2010)
The Ice Prince  (2011)
The Real Rio D'Aquila  (2011)

A Walk Down the Aisle Series Multi-Author
Yesterday and Forever (1992)

Secrets Series Multi-Author
A Woman Accused (1993)

Postcards from Europe Multi-Author
Roman Spring (1993)

From Here To Paternity Europe Multi-Author
A Proper Wife (1996)

Do Not Disturb Series Multi-Author
The Bridal Suite (1998)

Passion Series Multi-Author
The Sexiest Man Alive (1998)

Valentin Series Multi-Author
The Bedroom Business (2000)

Red-Hot Revenge Multi-Author
Cole Cameron's Revenge (2001)

Cooper's Corner Series Multi-Author
Dancing in the Dark (2002)

Forrester Square Series Multi-Author
4. Ring of Deception (2003)

The Ramirez Bride Series Multi-Author
3. The Disobedient Virgin (2005)

The Royal House of Karedes Series Multi-Author
Billionaire Prince, Pregnant Mistress (2009)

Collections
Desert Destiny: Sheikh's Revenge, Hostage of the Hawk (1994)
High Society Grooms (2002)
Raising the Stakes / The Runaway Mistress (2005)
Bride Said Never! / Enticing Proposal (2008)

Omnibus In Collaboration
Christmas Affairs (1998) (with Helen Bianchin and Sharon Kendrick)
Desert Heat (1999) (with Emma Darcy and Lynne Graham)
Amnesia (2000) (with Lee Wilkinson and Rebecca Winters)
Father and Child (2000) (with Jacqueline Baird and Emma Darcy)
Married in Spring (2001) (with Stella Cameron and Bobby Hutchinson)
Nine to Five (2001) (with Kim Lawrence and Cathy Williams)
Seduced by a Sultan (2004) (with Emma Darcy and Liz Fielding)
His Boardroom Mistress (2005) (with Helen Bianchin and Cathy Williams)
Outback Reunion / Disobedient Virgin (2005) (with Bronwyn Jameson)
Seduced by Christmas (2007) (with Yvonne Lindsay)
Mothers Wanted (2008) (with Jessica Hart and Marion Lennox)
Hot City Nights (2008) (with Sarah Mayberry and Emilie Rose)
His Contract Bride (2009) (with Sara Craven and Day Leclaire)
Merry Christmas Love (2009) (with Diana Hamilton, Penny Jordan, Jane Porter and Margaret Way)

References and Resources

Sandra Marton's Official Website
Sandra Marton's Webpage in Harlequin Enterprises Ltd
Sandra Marton's Webpage in Fantastic Fiction's Website

20th-century American novelists
21st-century American novelists
American romantic fiction writers
Living people
American women novelists
Women romantic fiction writers
20th-century American women writers
21st-century American women writers
Year of birth missing (living people)